The Höllpass is a  high mountain pass in the northern part of the Fichtel Mountains in Bavaria, Germany. 

The Höllpass is located in the northwest of the horseshoe-shaped Fichtelgebirge range, the horseshoe being open to the east. It lies between the ridges of the Waldstein to the north and the Schneeberg–Ochsenkopf Massif to the south, which were formed almost at right angles to the tectonic fault lines in the Fichtelgebirge.

See also
 List of highest paved roads in Europe
 List of mountain passes

References 

Mountain passes of Bavaria
Fichtel Mountains